Gnaeus Domitius Ahenobarbus was the name of several Roman politicians:

Gnaeus Domitius Ahenobarbus (consul 192 BC).
Gnaeus Domitius Ahenobarbus (consul 162 BC), son of the previous.
Gnaeus Domitius Ahenobarbus (consul 122 BC), son of the previous.
Gnaeus Domitius Ahenobarbus (consul 96 BC), son of the previous.
Gnaeus Domitius Ahenobarbus (died 81 BC), son of the previous.
Gnaeus Domitius Ahenobarbus (praetor 54 BC), likely the son of Lucius Domitius Ahenobarbus (consul 94 BC).
Gnaeus Domitius Ahenobarbus (consul 32 BC), grandson of the previous.
Gnaeus Domitius Ahenobarbus (consul 32), grandson of the previous and father of the emperor Nero

See also
Ahenobarbus (disambiguation)